Noflan is a flame retardant chemical. It was developed in the 1980s by the Moscow State Textile University and the Semenov Institute of Chemical Physics in Moscow, with the aim of fire-proofing the fabric used in Soviet spacecraft. In the 1990s the technology was commercialised and licensed to Firestop Chemicals.

Composition

As halogens and antimony containing flame retardant result in unwanted degradation, alternatives have been under research.
Noflan is a complex of the amide of alkylphosphonic acid ammonium salt with ammonium chloride but is also alleged to cause corrosion.

Uses
Noflan is used to treat fabric and carpets in trains, buses and aircraft, including the Airbus A380.

Gävle straw goat
Noflan was used to protect a giant straw yule goat or julbocken from arson in Gävle, Sweden during December 2006.

References

 New Scientist 22/11/07

External links
 http://www.firestop.uk.com/textiles.htm Firestop's page on Noflan

Flame retardants